William Strobeck (born March 17, 1978) is an American filmmaker, director, videographer, and photographer based out of New York City. Strobeck directed the skate videos: cherry (2014), BLESSED (2018), CANDYLAND (2019), STALLION (2021) and PLAY DEAD (2022).

Early life 
Born in Syracuse, New York to a single mother, Strobeck grew up with his grandmother, mother, and other family members. His mother was diagnosed with schizophrenia when Will was growing up which resulted in her not being around for a period. Strobeck moved around living with different family members until his mother found proper treatment. After receiving treatment and reentering his life, Strobeck's mother encouraged his creativity and freedom. Strobeck describes the void left by his mother's partial absence in his childhood as having a strong influence on his creativity.

Filmmaking
As a young teenager in the 1990s, Strobeck first started filming his friends outside the Everson Museum of Art in the center of Syracuse. At the time, the museum considered skating an art form and allowed the skaters to skate the plaza in front of it. 

In 1996, Strobeck moved to Philadelphia at the age of 17. Strobeck filmed skateboarding during the Love Park skate scene from 1997 until 2003. As the popularity of the Philadelphia skateboard scene grew, Alien Workshop offered Strobeck a daily retainer to be a skate videographer for the company. By 1998, Strobeck had quit community college and doing deliveries to work on the Alien Workshop video Photosynthesis full time.  In 2004, Strobeck self funded a day in the life film starring Mark Gonzales and Jason Dill, titled DIZZY.

In 2006, Strobeck directed "McBeth - Mark Gonzales" - The Journal, No. 17 - starring Mark Gonzales, running 12 minutes and released with Krooked skateboards.

In 2009, Strobeck teamed up with Gonz and Jason Schwartzman to make the video for the track 'Any Fun' by Schwartzman's Coconut Records' solo project.

Strobeck produced a section for [[Transworld Skateboarding|TransWorld'''s]] 24th video, The Cinematographer Project, released in 2012, featuring Mark Gonzales, Alex Olson, Jake Johnson, Austyn Gillette, Danny Garcia, Dylan Rieder, and Jason Dill.

In 2012, Strobeck released a short film: "My Lovely Mess," featuring Chris Kennedy, Lizzi Bougatsos, Chloe Sevigny, Lily Ludlow, Stacy Strobeck, Tara Subkoff, David Clark, Alex Olson, Lil' Naomi, and Natasha Lyonne. "My Lovely Mess" was described by one reviewer as "haunting but often very funny."

Also in 2012, Strobeck began filming his first feature length video for Supreme called Cherry. cherry was released in 2014, featuring a large variety of skaters in a series of montages accompanied by a two parts, one by Paulo Diaz and one shared part by Dylan Rieder and Alex Olson. Cherry, Supreme's first skate video in almost 20 years, received positive reviews from fans and critics.

In 2015 Strobeck released "the red devil" produced by Supreme, shot on the streets of New York and Los Angeles, featuring Aidan Mackey, Sean Pablo, Anthony Van Engelen, Alex Olson, Sage Elsesser, Jason Dill, Tyshawn Jones, Kevin Bradley, and Na-kel Smith.

In 2015, Strobeck released SICKNESS, a collaboration between Supreme and Thrasher that is set in the San Francisco Bay Area. Featuring Aidan Mackey, Sean Pablo, Sage Elsesser, Tyshawn Jones, and Kevin Bradley.

In 2016, Strobeck released Pussy Gangster a 10-minute long collaboration with Supreme featuring Tyshawn Jones, Sage Elsesser, Kevin Bradley, Sean Pablo, Ben Kadow, Na-kel Smith and others.

In 2016, Strobeck released KING PUPPY a 5-minute long collaboration between Supreme x Nike SB, featuring Grant Taylor, Kevin Bradley, Eric Koston, Sage Elsesser, and Sean Pablo.

In 2018, Strobeck released the 84 minute-long BLESSED, also through the Supreme brand studio. BLESSED features 2018 SOTY Tyshawn Jones, Ben Kadow, Aidan Mackey, Sean Pablo, Vincent Touzery, Jason Dill, Kevin Bradley, Mark Gonzales, Na-Kel Smith, Sage Elsesser, and others.

In 2019, Supreme (in collaboration with San Francisco-based skate crew GX1000) and Strobeck released CANDYLAND, a feature length skate video dedicated to Pablo Ramirez.

In 2021, Strobeck released STALLION, another feature length video that was filmed in Milan and meant to coincide with the opening of Supreme's Milan store. Also in 2021, Strobeck released Mind Goblin featuring Tyshawn Jones, Sage Elsesser, Kader Sylla, Ben Kadow, and others filmed in Berlin.

Skateboarding videos

 Photography 

 Art exhibitions 
In November 2019, William Strobeck opened an art show, My Lovely Mess'', at MILK gallery featuring large scale photographs, projectors playing his skate videos, and a recreation of his bedroom in the middle of the gallery.

References

External links
"My Lovely Mess" - William Strobeck - Vimeo

1978 births
Living people
Film directors from New York (state)
American skateboarders
Artists from New York City
Skateboarding video directors
Skate photographers
Photographers from New York (state)
Filmmakers from New York (state)
Artists from Syracuse, New York
Artist skateboarders